Namsan (literally South Mountain) is a common name for Korean mountains and hills.

Namsan may refer to:

Mountains 
 Namsan (Chagang) in Chagang Province, North Korea
 Namsan (Chungju) in Chungju City, North Chungcheong Province, South Korea
 Namsan (Gyeongju) in the heart of Gyeongju National Park, in Gyeongju City, North Gyeongsang Province, South Korea.
 Namsan (Haeju) in Haeju-si, South Hwanghae Province, North Korea
 Namsan (Sangju) in Sangju City, North Gyeongsang Province, South Korea
 Namsan (Seoul) in the Jung-gu district of Seoul, South Korea
 Namsan (Unnyul) in Eunyul-gun, South Hwanghae Province, North Korea

People 
 Yeon Namsan (639–701), third son of the Goguryeo military leader and dictator Yeon Gaesomun

Stations 
 Namsan station (Busan Metro), a station of Busan Metro Line 1 in Busan, South Korea
 Namsanjeong station, a station of Busan Metro Line 3 in Busan, South Korea

See also
 南山 (disambiguation)
 Nanshan (disambiguation)
 South Mountain (disambiguation)